Sankar Kumar Pal (born 1950) is a computer scientist and president(&former director) of the Indian Statistical Institute, Kolkata. He is a computer scientist with an international reputation on fuzzy neural network, soft computing, and machine intelligence. He founded the Machine Intelligence Unit in 1993, and the Center for Soft Computing Research: A National Facility in 2004, both at the ISI. He is the founder president of the Indian National Academy of Engineering, Kolkata Chapter.

He is a recipient of S.S. Bhatnagar Prize in 1990. He was awarded Padma Shri in Science and Engineering on 5 April 2013 by the President of India Pranab Mukherjee in recognition of his work in machine intelligence.

Education and career

SK Pal studied at the University of Calcutta for his BSc in physics (1969), BTech (1972) and MTech (1974). 
He received a PhD in radio physics and electronics from the Rajabazar Science College campus of University of Calcutta in 1979 as a student of Indian Statistical Institute, and another PhD in electrical engineering along with Diploma of the Imperial College from Imperial College, University of London, in 1982. He worked at the University of California, Berkeley and University of Maryland, College Park from 1986 to 1987 as Fulbright Fellow, NASA Johnson Space Center from 1990 to 1992 and in 1994 as US NAS-NRC Senior Research Associate, distinguished visitor of IEEE Computer Society (USA) for Asia-Pacific Region in 1997, and US Naval Research Laboratory, Washington, D.C. in 2004 as a visiting scientist. Besides, he held several visiting positions in Australia, Poland, Italy, and Hong Kong universities as IEEE Distinguished Visitor. He joined the Indian Statistical Institute (ISI), Kolkata, as the CSIR Senior Research Fellow in 1975, and eventually entered into full faculty in 1987, as professor. He then became distinguished scientist in 1998, director in 2005, and president in 2022. He was the first computer scientist as well as someone outside statistics and mathematics to become the director of ISI in its 76-year history.

His areas of research interests include fuzzy sets and uncertainty analysis, artificial neural networks for machine intelligence, pattern recognition, image processing, data mining, granular computing, genetic algorithms, rough sets, and soft computing with applications such as in bioinformatics, video analytics, online social network anlysis, and cognitive mind development. He has pioneered hybrid intelligent systems like neuro fuzzy and rough fuzzy hybridization. Prof. Pal is widely recognized across the world for his pioneering and extraordinary contributions in Machine Intelligence, Fuzzy Logic, Soft Computing and Pattern Recognition. This has made India a leader in these disciplines in international scenario. He is a co-author of twenty one books and more than four hundred and fifty research publications. He has served/serving as editor in most of the well-known scientific journal in computer science and engineering (~25 international journals). He visited more than forty countries as a Keynote/ Invited speaker or academic visitor.

According to Google Scholar, as of Sept 2022 Pal's work had been cited 35,000+ times.

Awards and recognition

SK Pal is the recipient of numerous awards including the 1990 Shanti Swarup Bhatnagar Prize (which is the most coveted award in science in India), Padma Shri award in 2013 (which is the fourth highest civilian award in India), the 1999 G.D. Birla Award, 1998 Om Bhasin Award from the Prime Minister of India, 1993 Jawaharlal Nehru Fellowship, 2000 Khwarizmi International Award from the president of Iran, 2000-2001 FICCI Award, 1993 Vikram Sarabhai Research Award, 1993 NASA Tech Briefs Award (USA), 1994 IEEE Trans. Neural Networks Outstanding Paper Award (USA), 1995 NASA Patent Application Award (USA), 1997 IETE-R.L. Wadhwa Gold Medal, the 2001 INSA-S.H. Zaheer Medal, 2005-06 Indian Science Congress-P.C. Mahalanobis Birth Centenary Gold Medal from Prime Minister of India for Lifetime Achievement, 2007 J.C. Bose Fellowship of the Government of India, 2008 Vigyan Ratna Award from Science & Culture Organization, 2013 Indian National Academy of Engineering Chair Professor, 2015 INAE-S.N. Mitra Award, 2017 INSA-Jawaharlal Nehru Birth Centenary Lecture Award, 2018 INSA Distinguished Professorial Chair, 2020 National Science Chair of the Government of India, and 2021 AICTE Distinguished Chair Professor. He is an elected Fellow of the Institute of Electrical and Electronics Engineers, the Academy of Sciences for the Developing World (TWAS), International Association for Pattern Recognition, International Fuzzy Systems Association, International Rough Set Society, Asia-Pacific Artificial Intelligence Association, Indian National Science Academy, National Academy of Sciences, India, Indian Academy of Sciences and Indian National Academy of Engineering. He is an elected member of the European Academy of Sciences and Arts. Currently, he is the President of Indian Statistical Institute.

References

External links
Official Homepage
Publication list at Indian Academy of Sciences
Biography at Yatedo
Biographical Dictionary of Indian Scientists
Publications at Google Scholar

Living people
1950 births
Artificial intelligence researchers
Academic staff of the Indian Statistical Institute
Indian computer scientists
Fellow Members of the IEEE
Scientists from Kolkata
Bengali scientists
Alumni of Imperial College London
University of Calcutta alumni
Recipients of the Padma Shri in science & engineering
Fellows of the Indian National Science Academy
Fellows of the Indian Academy of Sciences
Fellows of The National Academy of Sciences, India
Jawaharlal Nehru Fellows
Fellows of the Indian National Academy of Engineering
20th-century Indian physicists
Fellows of the International Association for Pattern Recognition
Recipients of the Shanti Swarup Bhatnagar Award in Engineering Science
Scientists from West Bengal